

The Los Rios Historic District is an historic district and neighborhood in the city of San Juan Capistrano, California. With buildings dating to 1794, it is the oldest continually occupied neighborhood in the state.  The nearby Mission San Juan Capistrano was the first of the 21 California Missions to have Indians, soldiers and workers live outside the mission grounds.  Three adobes remains in the Los Rios neighborhood itself, although there are a number of others close by which were part of what was once a larger neighborhood.

The neighborhood originally had 40 adobe structures, but most were replaced in the 19th century by wooden board and batten structures.  Thirty-one of the buildings on Los Rios Street and the surrounding area are listed on the National Register of Historic Places as of 1983.

See also
 Mission San Juan Capistrano
 El Adobe de Capistrano
 San Juan Capistrano Depot

Gallery

References

External links

 Official website

San Juan Capistrano, California
National Register of Historic Places in Orange County, California
Historic districts on the National Register of Historic Places in California